Rohingya crisis may refer to
Rohingya conflict, an ongoing conflict in Myanmar
Rohingya massacres (disambiguation)
Rohingya genocide, persecutions by the Myanmar government against the Muslim Rohingya people beginning in 2016
2015 Rohingya refugee crisis, the mass migration of people from Myanmar in 2015